Palau competed at the 2019 Pacific Games in Apia, Samoa from 7 to 20 July 2019. The country participated in seven sports at the 2019 games.

Archery

Four male archers were selected to compete for Palau at the 2019 games.

Men
 Brandon Giramur
 Edward Kenic
 Christopher Ongrung
 Tutii Chilton

Athletics

Judo

Two male athletes were selected to compete for Palau in Judo at the 2019 games.

Men
 Jarvis Tarkong
 Malcolm Gaymann

Outrigger canoeing

Swimming

Table tennis

Volleyball

Beach volleyball

Four players were selected to compete for Palau in beach volleyball at the 2019 games.

Men
 Texxon Taro
 Edson Ngiraiwet

Women
 Hila Asanuma
 Holly Yamada

References

Nations at the 2019 Pacific Games
2019